General Levi Casey (February 3, 1807) was a United States representative from South Carolina. He was born in the Province of South Carolina and served in the South Carolina militia during the American Revolutionary War. Son of Abner Casey, he served in the American Revolutionary War along with his step brothers, brother(s) and nephews. One of his stepbrothers, Benjamin Casey was killed in action at Camp Middlebrook, New Jersey. He married Elizabeth Duckett in 1775.  He reached the rank of brigadier general in the South Carolina militia. After the war, he served as justice of Newberry County Court in 1785.

Casey was a member of the South Carolina Senate in 1781 and 1782 and 1800–1802 and a member of the South Carolina House of Representatives 1786–1788, 1792–1795 and 1798–1799. He was elected as a Republican to the Eighth and Ninth Congresses and served from March 4, 1803, until his death, before the close of the Ninth Congress. Prior to dying, he had been reelected to the Tenth Congress. He died in Washington, D.C., February 3, 1807 and was buried in the Congressional Cemetery.

See also
List of United States Congress members who died in office (1790–1899)

References

External links

 General Levi Casey Chapter of the Daughters of the American Revolution, Dallas, Texas

1752 births
1807 deaths
American militia generals
Burials at the Congressional Cemetery
South Carolina militiamen in the American Revolution
Democratic-Republican Party members of the United States House of Representatives from South Carolina